James William Cole (August 14, 1927 – March 1, 2014) was an American football coach and player. As a college football player at the University of Oklahoma, he was a member of teams that won 31 consecutive games under head coach Bud Wilkinson. Cole served as the head football coach at Southwestern Oklahoma State University from 1958 to 1963 and Northwestern Oklahoma State University from 1968 to 1971.

Cole played football at Hollis High School in Hollis, Oklahoma before graduating 1947. At Oklahoma, he played as a tackle. Following his graduation from Oklahoma, Cole assisted with coaching the freshman football team at his alma mater. After serving in the military, he was appointed line coach at Southwestern Oklahoma State in June 1954, serving for four seasons under Joe Metcalf before succeeding him as head coach in January 1958.

Head coaching record

References

1927 births
2014 deaths
American football tackles
Northwestern Oklahoma State Rangers football coaches
Oklahoma Sooners football coaches
Oklahoma Sooners football players
Southwestern Oklahoma State Bulldogs football coaches
People from Hollis, Oklahoma
Coaches of American football from Oklahoma
Players of American football from Oklahoma